Bang Sung-joon (born July 10, 1990), credited mononymously as Sung Joon, is a South Korean actor and model. He became best known for his leading roles in the television series Flower Band (2012), Can We Get Married? (2012), I Need Romance 3 (2014), High Society (2015) and Madame Antoine: The Love Therapist (2016). He also appeared in the films Dangerously Excited (2012), Horror Stories 2 (2013), Pluto (2013) and The Villainess (2017).

Career

Beginnings
Sung Joon began his entertainment career as a model, but soon switched to acting and debuted in the drama White Christmas in 2011. The same year he was cast in a supporting role in Lie to Me. In 2012, he was cast in a leading role in the teen drama Flower Band, where he played a free-spirited leader of a rock band.

Sung Joon made his film debut with Dangerously Excited.

Mainstream acting
In 2013, Sung Joon was cast in a lead role in the romantic comedy drama Can We Get Married? opposite Jung So-min.  The same year, he starred in his first historical drama, Gu Family Book. Sung also starred in the horror film Horror Stories 2 and in the high school thriller Pluto.

In 2014, he was cast in the third installment of TvN's romantic comedy I Need Romance 3 in which he portrayed the character of a care-free songwriter. Later that year he took on the role of a plastic surgeon for the drama Discovery of Love.

In 2015, Sung Joon was cast as the lead in mystery melodrama High Society, playing a man who succeeds in spite of his poor family background. That same year, he also had a supporting role in Hyde Jekyll, Me, a romantic comedy where he played a hypnosis specialist.

In 2016, Sung Joon played the male lead in the romantic comedy drama Madame Antoine: The Love Therapist alongside Han Ye-seul.

In 2017, Sung Joon starred in the mystery comedy, Ms. Perfect alongside Ko So-young, playing a lawyer.

In 2021, Sung Joon joined the film Ghost Mansion, making a comeback to the big screen four years after his discharge from military service.

Personal life
Sung Joon maintains close friendships with fellow models-turned-actors Kim Young-kwang, Lee Soo-hyuk, Kim Woo-bin and Hong Jong-hyun – all whom he worked onscreen with in White Christmas. They were given the nickname of Model Avengers by their fans.

Sung Joon quietly enlisted for his mandatory military service on December 18, 2018. He completed five weeks of basic training at the Army's 2nd Infantry Division in Gangwon Province. Before his enlistment, he was in a relationship with his non-celebrity girlfriend, whom he had a child with together. In August 2020, Sung's agency O& Entertainment announced he would hold a private wedding on September 12, 2020.

Filmography

Film

Television series

Web series

Television show

Discography

Awards and nominations

References

External links

South Korean male film actors
South Korean male television actors
South Korean male models
1990 births
Living people
Onyang Bang clan